The International Harvester Company (IHC) has been building its own proprietary truck engines since the introduction of their first truck in 1907. International tended to use proprietary diesel engines. In the 1970s, IHC built the DVT 573 V-8 diesel of  but these were not highly regarded and relatively few were sold. Their DT 466 engine started in 1974 and was very successful.

IHC engines
In 1915 a new L-head water-cooled  inline-four engine appeared. While International's own engines underwent constant developments, the pace of truck production in the twenties was such that others' engines (from Waukesha, Buda, and Lycoming for instance) had to be installed in some parts of the range.

International Harvester's first in house six-cylinder engines appeared in some of the 1926 S-series trucks, seemingly a response to market pressures rather than to any particular need for such a layout. In 1928, a new heavy range of trucks (the HS-series) built around a series of engines from Hall-Scott appeared. These engines were used by IHC for some heavy-duty applications until 1935, although their own large engines ( FBD and  FEB) had appeared in 1932. The medium-duty 1930 A-series trucks received the all-new  FB-3 six-cylinder engine, with overhead valves and seven main bearings. This was complemented by larger versions of the same engine and was built until late 1940 (as the FBB), the line-up being expanded downward by the smaller FA-series (later FAB) in 1933.

The HD inline-sixes, later to become the first in International's long running "Diamond" series, first appeared in the C-30 truck of 1934. Available in three different displacements (see table), they were renamed "Green Diamond" in late 1940 for the 1941 model year after a number of detail improvements. This year also brought the new "Blue Diamond" (FAC) and "Red Diamond" (FBC) engines. A post-war version of the  Blue Diamond became the "Super Blue Diamond" when installed in the post-war medium L-line trucks. The Blue Diamond engine lived on until the early 60's renamed as Black Diamond engines, the BD-282 and BD-308.

International Harvester/Navistar engines

Navistar DT engines

MaxxForce engines

MWM-International engines 
In 2005, Navistar acquired MWM International Motores, a Brazilian diesel engine manufacturer formerly associated with the German manufacturer of the same name, Motoren Werke Mannheim AG (MWM). Now called "MWM International Ind. de Motores da America do Sul Ltda.", it has two manufacturing plants: one in São Paulo, Brazil and another in Cordoba, Argentina. Since it was bought by the American group, in addition to the engines manufactured using its own technology and know-how, it has produced two models denominated "NGD", New Generation Diesel, under the brand of "MWM-International". One being a 4-cylinder 3.0 L turbo diesel, featuring piezoelectric common rail direct injection. This engine equipped the South American version of the Ford Ranger and the Troller T4, a Brazil exclusive four wheel drive vehicle. A 6-cylinder 9.3 L turbo diesel was also produced, but mainly dedicated to stationary power applications and the medium-sized trucks, the Volkswagen Constellation Series.

References 

Engines
 Engines
Truck-related lists